Billy McLaughlan (25 September 1950 – May 1972) was a Scottish football right back who played in the Scottish League for Cowdenbeath.

Personal life 
At the age of just 21, McLauchlan died of accidental electrocution in an accident at home.

Honours 
Cowdenbeath

 Scottish League Second Division second-place promotion: 1969–70

Individual

Cowdenbeath Hall of Fame

References 

Scottish footballers
Cowdenbeath F.C. players
Scottish Football League players
Place of birth missing
1972 deaths
1950 births
Accidental deaths by electrocution
Association football fullbacks